Andrée Boisson (21 October 1900 – 18 July 1973) was a French fencer. She competed in the women's individual foil event at the 1936 Summer Olympics.

References

External links
 

1900 births
1973 deaths
French female foil fencers
Olympic fencers of France
Fencers at the 1936 Summer Olympics
20th-century French women